James Whitfield (November 3, 1770 – October 19, 1834) was an English-born prelate of the Roman Catholic Church in the United States. He served as Archbishop of the Archdiocese of Baltimore, Maryland from 1828 until his death in 1834.

Biography
James Whitfield was born in Liverpool, Lancashire (now Merseyside), England, to James and Ann (née Genders) Whitfield. Following his father's death in 1787, James and his ailing mother traveled to Italy in the hope that the warmer climate would be better for her health; he there embarked in commercial pursuits. During their return to England, they were detained in Lyons, France, by one of Napoleon's embargoes against the English government. Whitfield there studied theology under Rev Ambrose Maréchal, S.S., and upon the authority of William Gibson, Vicar Apostolic of the Northern District of England, was ordained to the priesthood by the Bishop of Grenoble, Claude Simon, on July 24, 1809. His mother died shortly afterwards and Whitfield then returned to England, where he became pastor of St Benet's Chapel in Netherton in 1811.

In 1817 Whitfield accepted an invitation from Ambrose Maréchal, then Archbishop of Baltimore, to come to the United States. Arriving in Maryland in September 1817, he served as a curate (and later rector) of Assumption Cathedral. He was named vicar general of the archdiocese in 1818.

On January 8, 1828, Whitfield was appointed Coadjutor Archbishop of Baltimore and Titular Archbishop of Apollonia by Pope Leo XII. Before he could be consecrated, however, Maréchal died on the following January 29 and Whitfield succeeded him as the fourth Archbishop of Baltimore. He was consecrated on Pentecost, May 25, 1828, by Bishop Benedict Joseph Flaget, S.S., with Bishops Henry Conwell and John Dubois, S.S., serving as co-consecrators, at the Baltimore Cathedral. In addition to his duties as Ordinary of the Baltimore Archdiocese, he served as Apostolic Administrator of Richmond, Virginia, from 1828 to 1834.

Whitfield was invested with the pallium, a vestment peculiar to metropolitan bishops, on October 4, 1829, the same day as the opening of the First Provincial Council of Baltimore. At this time, the archdiocese comprised around 87,000 Catholics and 52 priests. He later convened a synod for the diocesan clergy in 1831, and the Second Provincial Council of Baltimore in 1833.

Throughout his tenure, Whitfield worked for the welfare of the African American community. He supported and authorized the foundation of the Oblate Sisters of Providence. He once said:

How distressing it is to be unable to send missionaries to Virginia, where there are five hundred thousand Negroes! It is indubitable that had we missionaries and funds to support them, prodigies would be effected in this vast and untilled field. In Maryland blacks are converted every day, and many of them are good Catholics and excellent Christians. At Baltimore many are frequent communicants, and three hundred or four hundred receive the Blessed Sacrament the first Sunday of every month. It is the same throughout Maryland, where there are a great many Catholics among the Negroes.

Whitfield, along with his priests and the sisters, was untiring in his devotion to those afflicted during the 1832 cholera outbreak. Two priests and three sisters, including an Oblate Sister of Providence, died while attending to the sick. He built at his own expense St. James the Less Roman Catholic Church in Baltimore

His health failing, Whitfield received Samuel Eccleston as his coadjutor in 1834, and died some months afterward, aged 64.

See also

 Catholic Church hierarchy
 Catholic Church in the United States
 Historical list of the Catholic bishops of the United States
 List of Catholic bishops of the United States
 Lists of patriarchs, archbishops, and bishops

References

External links
Archdiocese of Baltimore Page About James Whitfield
Roman Catholic Archdiocese of Baltimore

1770 births
1834 deaths
Clergy from Liverpool
English emigrants to the United States
Roman Catholic archbishops of Baltimore
English Roman Catholic priests
19th-century Roman Catholic archbishops in the United States
Burials at the Basilica of the National Shrine of the Assumption of the Blessed Virgin Mary